Novo-Durovo is a rural locality (a village) in Kupreyevskoye Rural Settlement, Gus-Khrustalny District, Vladimir Oblast, Russia. The population was 206 as of 2010.

Geography 
Novo-Durovo is located on the Charmus River, 66 km southeast of Gus-Khrustalny (the district's administrative centre) by road. Dolbino is the nearest rural locality.

References 

Rural localities in Gus-Khrustalny District